Joaquín Leguina Herrán (born 5 May 1941) is a Spanish politician and writer. A member of the Spanish Socialist Workers' Party (PSOE) he became the first President of the Community of Madrid, serving from 1983 and 1995. He also was Secretary-General of the Socialist Party of Madrid from 1979 to 1991.

Biography 
After leaving the presidency of the Madrid region, he became a member of the PSOE National Executive Board presided by Joaquín Almunia. He also returned to the Congress of Deputies, becoming a member of the 6th, 7th and 8th terms of the Lower House in representation of Madrid. During the 8th term he chaired the Defence Committee of the Congress of Deputies.

Positions 
A staunch critic of the Catalan pro-independence movement, he became a member of the Libres e Iguales platform in 2014, signing their manifesto. Later the same year, he likened Artur Mas to the Pied Piper of Hamelin.

Works 

 Los ríos desbordados, un ensayo político. Plaza & Janes, 1994.
 La luz crepuscular. Alfaguara, 2009.
 Os salvaré la vida (together with Rubén Buren). Espasa, 2017.

Notes

References 

1941 births
Leaders of political parties in Spain
Living people
Spanish Socialist Workers' Party politicians
Members of the 1st Assembly of Madrid
Members of the 2nd Assembly of Madrid
Members of the 3rd Assembly of Madrid
Members of the 4th Assembly of Madrid
Madrid city councillors (1979–1983)
Members of the Socialist Parliamentary Group (Assembly of Madrid)